Yevgeni Gennadyevich Popov (born 14 February 1988) is a Russian former professional football player.

Club career
He made his Russian Football National League debut for FC Tekstilshchik Ivanovo on 7 July 2019 in a game against FC Yenisey Krasnoyarsk.

External links
 Career summary at sportbox.ru

1988 births
Sportspeople from Ivanovo
Living people
Russian footballers
Association football midfielders
FC Tekstilshchik Ivanovo players
FC Torpedo Vladimir players